Edingtonite is a white, gray, brown, colorless, pink or yellow zeolite mineral. Its chemical formula is BaAl2Si3O10·4H2O. It has varieties with tetragonal, orthorhombic or triclinic crystals.

The mineral occurs within cavities in nepheline syenites, carbonatites, in
hydrothermal veins and various mafic rocks. It occurs associated with thomsonite, analcime, natrolite, harmotome, brewsterite, prehnite and calcite.

The mineral was first reported by and named for Scottish mineral collector James Edington (1787–1844). Other sources (including the mineralogist Haidinger) credit Scottish geologist and mineralogist Thomas Edington (1814-1859). However, as the mineral was named in 1825, the former accreditation must be the true one.

References

External links

Edingtonite structure

Zeolites